This article covers the 2008 Super 14 season results and statistics of Super Rugby side, the Reds.

Regular season

Week 1

Week 2

Week 3

Week 4

Week 5

Week 6

Week 7

Week 8

Week 9

! align=centre colspan=100| Bye
|- bgcolor="#FFFFFF"
| Chiefs
| Reds

Week 10

Week 11

Week 12

Week 13

Week 14

Table

Table notes
Pos = Table Position
Pld = Played
W   = Win (Worth 4 points)
D   = Draw (Worth 2 points)
L   = Loss (Worth 0 points)
F   = For (Total points scored)
A   = Against (Total points scored against)
+/- = Points difference (The total of For minus Against points)
BP  = Bonus Point
Teams can score up to two additional bonus points in each regular season match. One bonus point will be awarded to any team that scores four tries or more in a single game, regardless of win/loss/draw. A bonus point will also be awarded to the losing side if the margin of loss is 7 points or less. Only the losing side can achieve the maximum 2 bonus points.
Pts = Progressive points tally

References

2008
2008 in Australian rugby union
2008 Super 14 season by team